Meryibre Khety, also known by his Horus name Meryibtawy, was a pharaoh of the 9th or 10th Dynasty of Egypt, during the First Intermediate Period.

Reign

Some scholars believe that Meryibre Khety was the founder of the 9th Dynasty, a Herakleopolitan nomarch who gathered enough authority to claim himself the legitimate successor of the 6th Dynasty pharaohs. It seems that Meryibre ruled over his neighboring nomarchs with an iron fist, and it is likely for this reason that in later times this ruler became Manetho's infamous Achthoes, a wicked king who went insane and then was killed by a crocodile.

Alternatively, other Egyptologists such as Jürgen von Beckerath believe instead that Meryibre reigned toward the end of the subsequent 10th Dynasty, shortly before king Merikare.

Because of the contrasting opinions of scholars, Meryibre's reign is difficult to account and date with reliability; if he really was the founder of the 9th Dynasty, his reign should have conventionally begun in c. 2160 BCE, while in the second case his reign should have started about a century later.

Attestations
As his name is not mentioned in the Turin King List (probably because the papyrus is very scattered at this point), this ruler is known only for few objects: a sort of copper brazier or basket from a tomb near Abydos (found along with a scribe's palette bearing the name of king Merikare) and now exhibited at the Louvre Museum, an ebony wand from Meir now at the Cairo Museum (JE 42835), an ivory casket fragment from Lisht and some other minor finds. Thanks to those few monuments, however, Meryibre's royal titulary is the most complete amongst the known pharaohs of this period.

References

External links
 Meryibre Khety's page on Eglyphica.net.

22nd-century BC Pharaohs
Nomarchs
Pharaohs of the Ninth Dynasty of Egypt
Pharaohs of the Tenth Dynasty of Egypt
Year of birth unknown
Year of death unknown